Kansas's 15th Senate district is one of 40 districts in the Kansas Senate. It has been represented by Republican Dan Goddard since 2017; Goddard lost renomination in 2020 to Virgil Peck Jr.

Geography
District 15 covers parts of Southeast Kansas, including all of Neosho County and most of Labette and Montgomery Counties. Communities in the district include Coffeyville, Parsons, Independence, Chanute, Caney, Cherryvale, and Oswego.

The district is located entirely within Kansas's 2nd congressional district, and overlaps with the 2nd, 7th, 9th, 11th, 12th, and 13th districts of the Kansas House of Representatives. It borders the state of Oklahoma.

Recent election results

2020

2016

2012
In 2012, incumbents Jeff King and Dwayne Umbarger were redistricted into the same district.

Federal and statewide results in District 15

References

15
Labette County, Kansas
Montgomery County, Kansas
Neosho County, Kansas